Birsen is a common feminine Turkish given name. It is also used as a surname, and less commonly a masculine given name. The name is produced by using two Turkish words: Bir and Sen. In Turkish, "Bir" means "One", and "Sen" means "You". Thus, "Birsen" means "Only You".

Given name
 Birsen Yavuz (born 1980), Turkish sprinter

Surname
 Metecan Birsen (born 1995), Turkish basketball player
 Osman Birsen (born 1945), Turkish high-ranking civil servant

Turkish-language surnames
Turkish feminine given names